The sulfate nitrates are a family of double salts that contain both sulfate and nitrate ions (NO3−, SO42−). They are in the class of mixed anion compounds. A few rare minerals are in this class. Two sulfate nitrates are in the class of anthropogenic compounds, accidentally made as a result of human activities in fertilizers that are a mix of ammonium nitrate and ammonium sulfate, and also in the atmosphere as polluting ammonia, nitrogen dioxide, and sulfur dioxide react with the oxygen and water there to form solid particles. The nitro group (NO3−) can act as a ligand, and complexes containing it can form salts with sulfate.

List

References

Sulfates
Nitrates
Mixed anion compounds